Béatrix Beck (14 July 1914 – 30 November 2008) was a French writer of Belgian origin.

She was born at Villars-sur-Ollon, Switzerland, the daughter of the poet Christian Beck. After several jobs, she became the secretary of André Gide who encouraged her to write about her experiences: her mother's suicide, the war, her poverty, etc. Beck died in Saint-Clair-sur-Epte in 2008.

Bibliography
1948 Barny
1950 Une mort irrégulière
1952 The Passionate Heart - Prix Goncourt, the French title is Léon Morin, prêtre
1954 Des accommodements avec le ciel
1963 Le muet
1967 Cou coupé court toujours
1977 L'épouvante l'émerveillement
1978 Noli
1979 La décharge - Prix du Livre Inter
1980 Devancer la nuit
1981 Josée dite Nancy
1983 Don Juan des forêts
1984 L'enfant-chat - Prix litteraire de Trente millions d'amis
1986 La prunelle des yeux
1988 Stella Corfou
1989 Une
1990 Grâce
1991 Recensement
1993 Une Lilliputienne
1994 Vulgaires vies
1994 Moi ou autres (nouvelles)
1996 Prénoms (nouvelles)
1997 Plus loin, mais où
1998 Confidences de gargouille
2000 La petite Italie (nouvelles)
2001 Guidée par le songe (nouvelles)Contes à l'enfant né coifféLa mer intérieureLa grenouille d'encrierMots couverts'' (poèmes)

References

1914 births
2008 deaths
20th-century Belgian poets
20th-century Belgian novelists
20th-century French women writers
20th-century French non-fiction writers
20th-century French short story writers
Belgian women poets
Belgian women short story writers
Belgian short story writers
Belgian poets in French
Belgian women novelists
People from Aigle District
Prix Goncourt winners
Prix Fénéon winners
Prix du Livre Inter winners
Academic staff of Université Laval